Always is the second extended play by Australian musician Panama, released in October 2013. The EP was certified platinum in Australia in 2020.

Reception
Jamie Macmillian from HappyMag said, "The EP has solidified their sound as a band and has brought them to the forefront of new music, both here and internationally." Macmillian described opening track "Always" as "a powerful and engulfing song" saying "It's a solid dance track with plenty of house influences, tinted with a bit of pop which makes it addictive listening." He said "How We Feel" is his personal favourite out of all three tracks saying "It's a little more experimental with interesting effects and loops with definite dub vibes. The vocals on this track sound R&B influenced and add an interesting layer to the song." He described "Destroyer" as "a restrained dance/house track that sounds like it's from outer space".

Carena Liptak from Audio Femme said "Like debut It's Not Over, Always gears towards an electrically colorful synth pop, but on this release McCleary assumes a new assuredness over his music's texture and subtlety."

Track listing

 Note, tracks 5-7 are on the Deluxe Edition.

Certifications

Release history

References

2013 EPs
EPs by Australian artists